George Cecil Unwin,  (18 January 1913 – 28 June 2006) was a Royal Air Force officer and flying ace of the Second World War.

Early life
Unwin was born in the town of Bolton upon Dearne, near Barnsley, Yorkshire, on 18 January 1913. He enlisted in the Royal Air Force (RAF) in 1929 as an administrative apprentice and, in 1935, was selected for pilot training. Upon completion of training he was posted to No. 19 Squadron RAF as a sergeant pilot.

RAF career

Spitfire trials
No. 19 Squadron was the first unit to receive the Supermarine Spitfire in 1938, and Unwin was one of the first to fly the machine (K9792) on 16 August.
Unwin carried out intensive trials in the type, flying 15 different Spitfires. During these trials, on 9 March 1939, Unwin deliberately crashed a Spitfire (K9797) following an engine failure to avoid a children's playground at Acton, Suffolk.

Battle of France
Unwin's first combat experience came during the final phase of the French Campaign during the Battle of Dunkirk. During a nine-day period of patrols between 26 May and 4 June Unwin claimed three kills and a probable during Operation Dynamo. Unwin described his first combat as stage fright:

The next day Unwin claimed his first kill, a Henschel Hs 126. The German pilot had used his slow speed and high manoeuvrability to evade the attacks of two fellow pilots, while retreating into Belgian airspace. The order was given to give up and the squadron turned away. As they did so Unwin saw the German straighten out. Feigning radio failure, Unwin dived on the Hs 126 and "pumped 240 rounds" into it before it burst into flames and crashed. On 1 June Unwin claimed a Messerschmitt Bf 110 and a second as a probable. Unwin then claimed a Heinkel He 111 as a probable.

Battle of Britain
During the Battle of Britain stationed in No. 12 Group he was credited with 14 enemy aircraft shot down by the end of 1940 and was awarded the Distinguished Flying Medal in October 1940 with a Bar award in December. On 15 September Unwin claimed three Bf 109s destroyed (Luftwaffe records indicate they were Bf 109s from JG 77) . On 18 September Unwin added a Bf 110 to his score as his 11th victory.

On 27 September Unwin destroyed a Bf 109- Wrk Nr 6162 of JG 52, and on 5 November scored a kill against a JG 51 Bf 109- Wrk Nr 4846. Unwin had now destroyed eight 109s. On 5 November Unwin shot down his final personal victory, a Bf 110 over the English Channel. Unwin was in turn attacked by Bf 109s and Hauptmann Gerhard Schöpfel of JG 26 claimed Unwin as one of two kills he claimed in that engagement, although Unwin was not shot down.

At the end of 1940 he was rested and sent as an instructor to No. 2 Central Flying School, Cranwell.

In July 1941 Unwin was commissioned and then served with 16 EFTS and 2 CIS until October 1943. In April 1944 he began flying DeHavilland Mosquito fighter-bombers with No. 613 Squadron, RAF Second Tactical Air Force until October 1944. He then served at the Central Gunnery School at RAF Catfoss, and subsequently RAF Leconfield until January 1946, when he became Chief Instructor at No 608 Squadron RAuxAF.

Service after the war
Unwin remained in the RAF after the war and transitioned to Bristol Brigand aircraft in 1948. He flew this type during the Malaya conflict in 1952 and was awarded the Distinguished Service Order for his efforts. He retired from the RAF in 1961 as a wing commander.

Later life
His service-wide nickname was "Grumpy"; supposedly after he complained about the noise squadron comrade Douglas Bader made repairing one of his leg prostheses late at night in late 1939. It kept Unwin awake and he let everyone know about it. Another story relates that it was due to his reaction at being left out of the squadron's operations during the Battle of Dunkirk on 26 May 1940, due to a shortage of aircraft.

In late May 2006 he was presented with a scale model of his Spitfire by Corgi Toys. George Unwin died of natural causes 28 June 2006 at the age of 93.

Honours and awards
1 October 1940 – Flight Sergeant George C Unwin (46298), No. 19 Squadron is appointed a Distinguished Flying Medal:

6 December 1940 – Flight Sergeant George C Unwin (46298), No. 19 Squadron is awarded a Bar to the Distinguished Flying Medal:

21 March 1952 awarded the Distinguished Service Order (DSO).

Exhibition
Unwin featured in an "exhibition about the men and women who lived, worked and fought for their country at RAF Duxford in Cambridgeshire from 1918 to 1961", which opened at RAF Duxford on 28 March 2013.

References

Bibliography
 Price, Dr Alfred. Spitfire Mark I/II Aces, 1939–41. Botley, Oxford, UK: Osprey Publishing, 1997. London. .
 Shores, Christopher and Clive Williams. Aces High. London: Grub Street, 1994.

External links
 Wing Commander George Unwin, Obituary, The Times, 29 June 2006.
 Imperial War Museum Interview

1913 births
2006 deaths
Military personnel from Yorkshire
People from Bolton upon Dearne
Royal Air Force pilots of World War II
Royal Air Force wing commanders
Royal Air Force personnel of the Malayan Emergency
Companions of the Distinguished Service Order
Recipients of the Distinguished Flying Medal
British World War II flying aces
The Few
English aviators